Old Broad Street Presbyterian Church and Cemetery is a historic church on Broad (New Jersey Route 49) and Lawrence Streets in Bridgeton, Cumberland County, New Jersey, United States. It was built in 1792 and added to the National Register of Historic Places in 1974.
The church and cemetery are also listed on both the New Jersey Register (ID #1029, since 1973)

Notable burials
 Ebenezer Elmer (1752–1843), represented New Jersey in the United States House of Representatives from 1801-1807.
 Jonathan Elmer (1745–1817), represented New Jersey in the United States Senate from 1789-1791.
 Lucius Elmer (1793–1883), represented New Jersey's 1st congressional district from 1843-1845.
 James G. Hampton (1814–1861), represented New Jersey's 1st congressional district in the United States House of Representatives from 1845 to 1849.
 John T. Nixon (1820–1889), represented  from 1859 to 1863.
 Elias P. Seeley (1791–1846), 11th Governor of New Jersey, serving in 1833.
 William G. Whiteley (1819–1886), represented Delaware in the United States House of Representatives from  1857 to 1861.
 General James Giles (1756-1825) Revolutionary War General who served under Washington 
Bloomfield H. Minch (1864–1929), President of the New Jersey Senate 
 Joseph Archibald Clark (1822–1914), one of the founders of Cumberland Glass Mfg. Co.
 Clement Waters Shoemaker (1848–1914), one of the founders of Cumberland Glass Mfg. Co. and philanthropist.
Thomas Whitaker Trenchard (1863–1942), Justice of the New Jersey Supreme Court from 1906 to 1941.
Hessian soldier from the American Revolutionary war

See also
Fairfield Presbyterian Church
National Register of Historic Places listings in Cumberland County, New Jersey

References

External links
 Presbyterian Cemetery at The Political Graveyard
 Old Broad Street Presbyterian Church Cemetery at Find A Grave

Bridgeton, New Jersey
Presbyterian churches in New Jersey
Churches on the National Register of Historic Places in New Jersey
Federal architecture in New Jersey
Churches completed in 1792
Churches in Cumberland County, New Jersey
Protestant Reformed cemeteries
Cemeteries in Cumberland County, New Jersey
National Register of Historic Places in Cumberland County, New Jersey
New Jersey Register of Historic Places
18th-century Presbyterian church buildings in the United States
1792 establishments in New Jersey